The neblina metaltail (Metallura odomae), locally called metalura neblina or colibrí de neblina, is a species of hummingbird in the "coquettes", tribe Lesbiini of subfamily Lesbiinae. It is found in Ecuador and Peru.

Taxonomy and systematics

The neblina metaltail was described in 1980 following expeditions sponsored by Louisiana State University's Museum of Zoology. The species is monotypic.

Description

It has a medium length, straight, black bill. The adult male has iridescent dark green upperparts. Its slightly forked tail is dark olive green on its upper side and shining golden green on its underside. The sides of its head and neck vary from bronzy olive to coppery bronze and its gorget is reddish purple to rosy red. The rest of its underparts are olive bronze with a buffy spotted appearance. Its undertail coverts are bronzy green with buffy cinnamon edges. The adult female is a duller version of the male. Its throat is spotted with rosy red and the rest of its underparts are tan with heavy bronzy spotting.

Distribution and habitat

The neblina metaltail is found from the northern part of Podocarpus National Park in Ecuador's Loja Province south to northern Piura and Cajamarca departments in Peru. It inhabits the edges of elfin forest and páramo, moist landscapes characterized by shrubby growth and small trees. ("Neblina" is Spanish for fog or mist.)

Behavior

Movement

The neblina metaltail is resident throughout its range.

Feeding

The neblina metaltail feeds mostly on nectar but details of its diet are lacking. Males defend feeding territories. In addition to nectaring, it catches small arthropods by sallies from a perch.

Breeding

Very little is known about the neblina metaltail's breeding phenology. The only nest was found in August; a female was on it. The nest was a cup made mostly from moss with lichens on the outside placed in a small cavity on a rock face.

Vocalization

The neblina metaltail's vocalizations have variously been described as "a rather loud seet-seet-seet-ti-tttt...and 'a jerky, wiry chatter'."

Status

The IUCN originally assessed the neblina metaltail as Threatened. The assessement was changed to Near Threatened in 2004 and to the present Least Concern in 2012. Though its population is estimated at fewer than 6700 mature individuals and is believed to be decreasing, much of its range is remote, protected, and not severely fragmented. It is considered fairly common in much of its range but local in Ecuador.

References

neblina metaltail
Birds of the Ecuadorian Andes
Birds of the Peruvian Andes
neblina metaltail
Taxonomy articles created by Polbot